Thembinkosi Rawula is a South African politician. He was a senior member of the Economic Freedom Fighters and a Member of Parliament for the party until he resigned in April 2019 after accusing party leaders of financial mismanagement.

Early life and education
Rawula is from the Eastern Cape. He holds a bachelor's degree in public administration from Nelson Mandela University, a post-graduate diploma in labour law from the University of Johannesburg and an honours degree in Public Administration from the University of South Africa.

Career
He was the labour coordinator of the National Union of Metalworkers of South Africa (NUMSA) in the Eastern Cape between 2003 and 2006. From 2014 to 2015, he was employed as a human resource and capacity building advisor.

Political career
Rawula served on the Central Command Team of the Economic Freedom Fighters as the member responsible for the party's labour and trade union relations.
He was sworn in as a Member of the National Assembly for the party on 31 October 2015. He replaced Kgotso Morapela, who was redeployed to the Free State Provincial Legislature. During his tenure as a parliamentarian, he was a member of the following portfolio committees: tourism, mineral resources and labour.

On 5 April 2019, Rawula accused party leader Julius Malema and his deputy Floyd Shivambu of abusing party funds to fund their lifestyles. On 7 April, he said that Malema's lawyers had demanded that he retract the accusations. On 10 April, Rawula resigned from the EFF and automatically ceased to be a member of parliament. He then joined NUMSA's political party, the Socialist Revolutionary Workers Party, on 16 April.

On 21 May 2019, Malema filed a defamation lawsuit against Rawula. The case was heard in November and the Eastern Cape division of the High Court ruled in favour of Rawula.

References

Living people
Year of birth missing (living people)
People from the Eastern Cape
Xhosa people
Members of the National Assembly of South Africa
Economic Freedom Fighters politicians
21st-century South African politicians